Aneek Dhar (born 26 April 1990 in Kolkata) is an Indian singer who started his musical career at the age of 17 winning Zee TV Sa Re Ga Ma Pa Challenge 2007 and Zee Bangla SaReGaMaPa both in the same year. He also was the winner of Bigg Boss Bangla Season 1. Dhar has been performing with his band since then in India as well as abroad. In 2018, Dhar started his career as a music composer mainly for his music videos, web series and films.

Education
Dhar was educated at the Nava Nalanda High School where he won the Nalanda Ratna award in 2009.

Singing career 
Dhar's first solo album, "Khwaishein" was released in 2008. "Khwaishein" Won Kalakar Awards in the Best Music Album category.

In 2008 Aneek participated in Zee TV's show Ek Se Badhkar Ek, and was an anchor for Zee Bangla Sa Re Ga Ma Pa. In 2011, he was a host for the show Zee Bangla Sa Re Ga Ma Pa Li'l Champ 2011. In 2012 he participated in the shows "Jo Jeeta Wohi Superstar -2" and Music Ka Maha Muqqabla on Star Plus, and he won the Bengali edition of the first season of Bigg Boss. He also hosted the game show Parar Shera Bouthan.

Television reality shows

Career as television show host

Career as grand jury

Music albums

Singles

Film playbacks

References

External links 
 

1989 births
Living people
Indian male singers
Big Brother (franchise) winners
Bigg Boss Bangla contestants
Singers from West Bengal